Mukhamed Setbievich Kilba is the current Secretary of the Security Council of Abkhazia. Kilba was appointed on 28 October 2014 by newly elected President Raul Khajimba.

References

Living people
Secretaries of the Security Council of Abkhazia
Year of birth missing (living people)